The Kensington Runestone is a slab of greywacke stone covered in runes that was allegedly discovered in central Minnesota in 1898. Olof Öhman, a Swedish immigrant, reported that he unearthed it from a field in the largely rural township of Solem in Douglas County. It was later named after the nearest settlement, Kensington.

The inscription purports to be a record left behind by Scandinavian explorers in the 14th century (internally dated to the year 1362). There has been a drawn-out debate regarding the stone's authenticity, but since the first scientific examination in 1910, the scholarly consensus has classified it as a 19th-century hoax, with some critics directly charging Öhman with fabrication. Nevertheless, there remains a community convinced of the stone's authenticity.

Provenance
Swedish immigrant Olof Öhman said that he found the stone late in 1898 while clearing land he had recently acquired of trees and stumps before plowing. The stone was said to be near the crest of a small knoll rising above the wetlands, lying face down and tangled in the root system of a stunted poplar tree estimated to be from less than 10 to about 40 years old. The artifact is about 30 × 16 × 6 inches (76 × 41 × 15 cm) in size and weighs . Öhman's 10-year-old son Edward noticed some markings, and the farmer later said he thought they had found an "Indian almanac".

During this period, the journey of Leif Ericson to Vinland (North America) was being widely discussed and there was renewed interest in the Vikings throughout Scandinavia, stirred by the National Romanticism movement. Five years earlier Norway had participated in the World's Columbian Exposition by sending the Viking, a replica of the Gokstad ship, to Chicago. There was also friction between Sweden and Norway (which ultimately led to Norway's independence from Sweden in 1905). Some Norwegians claimed the stone was a Swedish hoax and there were similar Swedish accusations because the stone references a joint expedition of Norwegians and Swedes. It is thought to be more than coincidental that the stone was found among Scandinavian newcomers in Minnesota, still struggling for acceptance and quite proud of their Nordic heritage.

A copy of the inscription made its way to the University of Minnesota. Olaus J. Breda (1853–1916), professor of Scandinavian Languages and Literature in the Scandinavian Department, declared the stone to be a forgery and published a discrediting article which appeared in Symra in 1910. Breda also forwarded copies of the inscription to fellow linguists and historians in Scandinavia, such as Oluf Rygh, Sophus Bugge, Gustav Storm, Magnus Olsen and Adolf Noreen. They "unanimously pronounced the Kensington inscription a fraud and forgery of recent date".

The stone was then sent to Northwestern University in Evanston, Illinois. Scholars either dismissed it as a prank or felt unable to identify a sustainable historical context and the stone was returned to Öhman. Hjalmar Holand, a Norwegian-American historian and author, claimed Öhman gave him the stone. However, the Minnesota Historical Society has a bill of sale showing Öhman sold them the stone for $10 in 1911. Holand renewed public interest with an article enthusiastically summarizing studies that were made by geologist Newton Horace Winchell (Minnesota Historical Society) and linguist George T. Flom (Philological Society of the University of Illinois), who both published opinions in 1910.

According to Winchell, the tree under which the stone was found had been destroyed before 1910. Several nearby poplars that witnesses estimated as being about the same size were cut down and, by counting their rings, it was determined they were around 30–40 years old. One member of the team who had excavated at the find site in 1899, county school superintendent Cleve Van Dyke, later recalled the trees being only 10 or 12 years old. The surrounding county had not been settled until 1858, and settlement was severely restricted for a time by the Dakota War of 1862 (although it was reported that the best land in the township adjacent to Solem, Holmes City, was already taken by 1867, by a mixture of Swedish, Norwegian and "Yankee" settlers).

Winchell estimated that the inscription was roughly 500 years old, by comparing its weathering with the weathering on the backside, which he assumed was glacial and 8000 years old. He also stated that the chisel marks were fresh. More recently geologist Harold Edwards has also noted that "The inscription is about as sharp as the day it was carved ... The letters are smooth showing virtually no weathering." Winchell also mentions in the same report that Prof. W. O. Hotchkiss, state geologist of Wisconsin, estimated that the runes were at least 50 to 100 years old. Meanwhile, Flom found a strong apparent divergence between the runes used in the Kensington inscription and those in use during the 14th century. Similarly, the language of the inscription was modern compared to the Nordic languages of the 14th century.

The Kensington Runestone is on display at the Runestone Museum in Alexandria, Minnesota.

Text and translation

The text consists of nine lines on the face of the stone, and three lines on the edge, read as follows:

Front:
8 : göter : ok : 22 : norrmen : po :
...o : opdagelsefärd : fro :
vinland : of : vest : vi :
hade : läger : ved : 2 : skjär : en :
dags : rise : norr : fro : deno : sten :
vi : var : ok : fiske : en : dagh : äptir :
vi : kom : hem : fan : 10 : man : röde :
af : blod : og : ded : AVM :
frälse : äf : illü.
Side:
här : (10) : mans : ve : havet : at : se :
äptir : vore : skip : 14 : dagh : rise :
from : deno : öh : ahr : 1362 :

The sequences rr, ll and gh represent actual digraphs. The AVM is written in Latin capitals.
The numbers given in Arabic numerals in the above transcription are given in pentadic numerals.
At least seven of the runes, including those transcribed a, d, v, j, ä, ö above, are not in any standard known from the medieval period (see below for details).
The language of the inscription is close to modern Swedish, the transliterated text being quite easily comprehensible to any speaker of a modern Scandinavian language. The language, being closer to the Swedish of the 19th than of the 14th century, is one of the main reasons for the scholarly consensus dismissing it as a hoax.

The text translates to:

"Eight Geats and twenty-two Norwegians on an exploration journey from Vinland to the west. We had camp by two skerries one day's journey north from this stone. We were [out] to fish one day. After we came home [we] found ten men red of blood and dead. AVM (Ave Virgo Maria) save [us] from evil."

"[We] have ten men by the sea to look after our ships, fourteen days' travel from this island. [In the] year 1362."

Linguistic analysis
Holand took the stone to Europe and, while newspapers in Minnesota carried articles hotly debating its authenticity, the stone was quickly dismissed by Swedish linguists.

For the next 40 years, Holand struggled to sway public and scholarly opinion about the Runestone, writing articles and several books. He achieved brief success in 1949, when the stone was put on display at the Smithsonian Institution, and scholars such as William Thalbitzer and S. N. Hagen published papers supporting its authenticity.
At nearly the same time, Scandinavian linguists Sven Jansson, Erik Moltke, Harry Andersen and K. M. Nielsen, along with a popular book by Erik Wahlgren, again questioned the Runestone's authenticity.

Along with Wahlgren, historian Theodore C. Blegen flatly asserted Öhman had carved the artifact as a prank, possibly with help from others in the Kensington area. Further resolution seemed to come with the 1976 published transcript of an interview of Frank Walter Gran, conducted by Paul Carson, Jr. on August 13, 1967, that had been recorded on audio tape. In it, Gran said his father John confessed in 1927 that Öhman made the inscription. John Gran's story, however, was based on second-hand anecdotes he had heard about Öhman, and although it was presented as a dying declaration, Gran lived for several more years, saying nothing more about the stone.

The possibility of the Runestone being an authentic 14th-century artifact was again raised in 1982 by Robert Hall, an emeritus professor of Italian language and literature at Cornell University, who published a book (and a follow up in 1994) questioning the methodology of its critics. Hall asserted that the odd philological problems in the Runestone could be the result of normal dialectal variances in Old Swedish of the period. He further contended that critics had failed to consider the physical evidence, which he found leaning heavily in favor of authenticity.

In The Vikings and America (1986), Wahlgren again stated that the text bore linguistic abnormalities and spellings that he thought suggested the Runestone was a forgery.

Lexical evidence
One of the main linguistic arguments for the rejection of the text as genuine Old Swedish is the term 
 'journey of discovery'. 
This lexeme is unattested in either Scandinavian, Low Franconian or Low German before the 16th century.
 is a loan from Low German , Dutch , which is in turn from High German , ultimately loan-translated from French  'to discover' in the 16th century.

The Norwegian historian Gustav Storm often used the modern Norwegian lexeme in late 19th-century articles on Viking exploration, creating a plausible incentive for the manufacturer of the inscription to use this word.

Grammatical evidence
Another characteristic pointed out by skeptics is the text's lack of cases.
Early Old Swedish (14th century) still retained the four cases of Old Norse, but Late Old Swedish (15th century) reduced its case structure to two cases, so that the absence of inflection in a Swedish text of the 14th century would be an irregularity.

Proponents of the stone's authenticity pointed to sporadic examples of these simpler forms in some 14th-century texts and to the great changes of the morphological system of the Scandinavian languages that began during the latter part of that century.

Paleographic evidence
The inscription contains pentadic numerals. Such numerals are known in Scandinavia, but nearly always from relatively recent times, not from verified medieval runic monuments, on which numbers were usually spelled out as words.

S. N. Hagen stated "The Kensington alphabet is a synthesis of older unsimplified runes, later dotted runes, and a number of Latin letters ... The runes for a, n, s and t are the old Danish unsimplified forms which should have been out of use for a long time [by the 14th century] ... I suggest that [a posited 14th century] creator must at some time or other in his life have been familiar with an inscription (or inscriptions) composed at a time when these unsimplified forms were still in use" and that he "was not a professional runic scribe before he left his homeland".

A possible origin for the irregular shape of the runes was discovered in 2004, in the 1883 notes of a then-16-year-old journeyman tailor with an interest in folk music, Edward Larsson. Larsson's aunt had migrated with her husband and son from Sweden to Crooked Lake, just outside Alexandria, Minnesota in 1870.
Larsson's sheet lists two different Futharks. The first Futhark consists of 22 runes, the last two of which are bind-runes, representing the letter-combinations EL and MW. His second Futhark consists of 27 runes, where the last three are specially adapted to represent the letters å, ä, and ö of the modern Swedish alphabet. The runes in this second set correspond closely to the non-standard runes in the Kensington inscription.

The abbreviation for Ave Maria consists of the Latin letters AVM.
Wahlgren (1958) noted that the carver had incised a notch on the upper right-hand corner of the letter V. The Massey Twins in their 2004 paper argued that this notch is consistent with a scribal abbreviation for a final -e used in the 14th century.

Purported historical context

Norse colonies are known to have existed in Greenland from the late 10th century to at least the 14th century, and at least one short-lived settlement was established in Newfoundland, at L'Anse aux Meadows, in the 11th century, but no other widely accepted material evidence of Norse contact with the Americas in the pre-Columbian era has yet emerged. Still, there is some limited documentary evidence for possible 14th-century Scandinavian expeditions to North America.

In a letter by Gerardus Mercator to John Dee, dated 1577, Mercator refers to a Jacob Cnoyen, who had learned that eight men returned to Norway from an expedition to the Arctic islands in 1364. One of the men, a priest, provided the King of Norway with a great deal of geographical information. In the early 19th century, Carl Christian Rafn mentioned a priest named Ivar Bardarsson who had previously been based in Greenland and turns up in Norwegian records from 1364 onward.

Furthermore, in 1354, King Magnus Eriksson of Sweden and Norway issued a letter appointing a law officer named Paul Knutsson as leader of an expedition to the colony of Greenland, in order to investigate reports that the population was turning away from Christian culture. Another of the documents reprinted by the 19th-century scholars was a scholarly attempt by Icelandic Bishop Gisli Oddsson, in 1637, to compile a history of the Arctic colonies. He dated the Greenlanders' fall away from Christianity to 1342 and claimed that they had turned instead to America. Supporters of a 14th-century origin for the Kensington Runestone argue that Knutson may, therefore, have travelled beyond Greenland to North America in search of renegade Greenlanders, whereupon most of his expedition was killed in Minnesota, leaving just the eight voyagers to return to Norway.

However, there is no evidence that the Knutson expedition ever set sail (the government of Norway went through considerable turmoil in 1355) and the information from Cnoyen as relayed by Mercator states specifically that the eight men who came to Norway in 1364 were not survivors of a recent expedition, but descended from the colonists who had settled the distant lands several generations earlier. Those early 19th-century books, which aroused a great deal of interest among Scandinavian Americans, would have been available to a late 19th-century hoaxer.

Hjalmar Holand adduced the "blond" Indians among the Mandan on the Upper Missouri River as possible descendants of the Swedish and Norwegian explorers. This was dismissed as "tangential" to the Runestone issue by Alice Beck Kehoe in her 2004 book The Kensington Runestone, Approaching a Research Question Holistically.

One possible route of such an expedition, connecting the Hudson Bay with Kensington, would lead up either Nelson River or Hayes River, through Lake Winnipeg, then up the Red River of the North. The northern waterway begins at Traverse Gap, on the other side of which is the source of the Minnesota River, which flows south to join the Mississippi River at Saint Paul/Minneapolis. This route was examined by Flom (1910), who found that explorers and traders had come from Hudson Bay to Minnesota by this route decades before the area was officially settled.

In popular culture
In May 2022, the St. Paul-based History Theatre premiered Runestone! A Rock Musical. The show, written by Mark Jensen and composed by Gary Rue, explores the impact of the runestone on Öhman and his family, but leaves the veracity of the carving up to the audience to judge.

See also
AVM Runestone, a hoax planted near the site of the Kensington runestone
Elbow Lake Runestone, a hoax planted in Minnesota
Beardmore Relics, Viking Age relics, supposedly found in Canada, associated with the Kensington runestone
Vérendrye Runestone, allegedly found west of the Great Lakes in the 1730s
Heavener Runestone, a runestone found in Oklahoma
Narragansett Runestone, marked stone visible during low tide in Rhode Island
Spirit Pond runestones, several small runestones found in Maine
Maine penny, a Norse coin that was found in Maine

References

Literature

External links

 Kensington Runestone Park in Solem Township, Douglas County, Minnesota
 Runestone Museum which houses the stone in Alexandria, Minnesota
360 View of Rune Stone Zoom into and view the stone just like you were at the museum.
History Channel UK interview with Peter Stormare about his TV series Secrets of the Viking Stone (originally The American Runestone)

1898 archaeological discoveries
19th-century hoaxes
19th-century inscriptions
Archaeological forgeries
Hoaxes in science
Hoaxes in the United States
Inscriptions of disputed origin
Minnesota folklore
Norse colonization of North America
North American runestone hoaxes
Pseudoarchaeology